Events from the 1690s in the Kingdom of Scotland.

Incumbents
Monarch
William II, r. 1689–1702 (Co-monarch with Mary II)
Mary II r. 1689–1694 (Co-monarch with William III & II)

Events
1690
 30 April – 1 May: the Jacobite rising of Viscount Dundee ends in defeat at the Battle of Cromdale.
1692
 13 February – massacre of Glencoe: Members of Clan MacDonald of Glencoe killed by members of Clan Campbell after they refuse to swear allegiance to King William III.
1694
 28 December – on the death of Queen Mary II, William III becomes sole monarch of Scotland, England and Ireland.
1695
 9 May – Parliament of Scotland assembles to investigate the Glencoe massacre.
 1 November – establishment of the Bank of Scotland.
1696
 Education Act of 1696 ordains a school in every parish (successful; act governs education until the 1872 act).
1698
 July – first expedition sets sail as part of the Darien scheme.
 November – the colony of New Caledonia established on the Isthmus of Panama.
1699
 The colony of New Caledonia abandoned; the colonists return to Scotland.
 September – the second expedition to Darien sets sail, unaware of the failure of the first.

Births
1692
 22 April – James Stirling, mathematician (died 1770)
1695
 5 October – John Glas, clergyman (died 1773)
1696
 11 June – James Francis Edward Keith, soldier (died 1758)
1698
 February – Colin Maclaurin, mathematician (died 1746)
 11 July – George Turnbull, philosopher, theologian, teacher, writer (died 1748)
1699
 17 April – Robert Blair, poet (died 1746)

Deaths
1690
 3 October – Robert Barclay, writer and Quaker (born 1648)
1692
 3 August – James Douglas, Earl of Angus, nobleman and soldier (born 1671)
1694
 28 December – Mary II, Queen of Scots (born 1662)
1695
 29 November – James Dalrymple, 1st Viscount of Stair, lawyer and statesman (born 1619)
1696
 2 August – Robert Campbell of Glenlyon, nobleman and commanding officer at the Massacre of Glencoe (born 1630)
1697
 26 March – Godfrey McCulloch, baronet and politician (executed for murder) (born c. 1640)
1699
 29 November – Patrick Gordon, general in the Russian Army (born 1635)

References